OK is the debut studio album by English / Indian tabla player and record producer Talvin Singh, released on Island Records in 1998. It won him the Mercury Prize for 1999. The record was included in the book 1001 Albums You Must Hear Before You Die. It took nine months of travelling around and recording to complete the album. Singh recorded in London and on Okinawa Island to capture folk singers, as well as in India to collaborate with the Madras Philharmonic Orchestra.

Singh hired various collaborators, including guitarist Jon Klein, with whom he had previously recorded on Siouxsie and the Banshees's single "Kiss Them for Me" and toured during the inaugural Lollapalooza festival. Ryuichi Sakamoto played flute on the album and sent his parts via a computer with an email which was a first in the late 1990s. Rakesh Chaurasia also performed flute. Singh recruited an eight female singer choir for the song "Soni". Guy Sigsworth played keyboards on the opening track "Traveller", and also on "Sutrix" and the title track of the album. Vocalist Suchitra Pillai joined in for the song "Sutrix".

In the NME, reviewer Christian Ward noted that Singh was "trying to cover the globe with his music", as a voice intones "The world is sound", at the start of the album. The record is rooted in India with odes to Asian underground scene, dub rhythms and jazz. There is also a contrast between "geisha choirs and cut-up beats", along with plaintive orchestral arrangements. Reviewer noted that "convulsive rhythms compete with sensuous strings to create a deep, dark atmosphere", concluding with this positive sentence, "There are still more sonic territories to explore, but on this evidence, it seems that Talvin Singh will get there first."

Track listing

Additional musicians Talvin collaborated with

 John Klein (guitar)
 Ryuichi Sakamoto (flute)
 Rakesh Chaurasia (flute)
 Guy Sigsworth (keyboards)
 Suchitra Pillai (vocals)

Charts

Certifications

References

External links
 

1998 debut albums
Talvin Singh albums
Island Records albums
Mercury Prize-winning albums